Infante of Spain (f. Infanta; Spanish: Infante de España; f. Infanta) is a royal title normally granted at birth to sons and daughters of reigning and past Spanish monarchs, and to the sons and daughters of the heir to the Crown. Individuals holding the title of infante also enjoy the style of Royal Highness.

Unlike other European monarchies, in Spain only the heir to the Crown is a prince or princess, holding the title of Prince or Princess of Asturias, together with other traditional titles. By tradition, all other sons and daughters of the Spanish monarch and that of the Prince or Princess of Asturias are called infantes.

Among other privileges, the infantes have the right to be buried in the Pantheon of Infantes in El Escorial. The sons and daughters of infantes bear the style of The Most Excellent (excelentísimo/a señor/a) and are considered as grandees of Spain.

The consorts of the Infantas Margarita and Cristina (Carlos Zurita and Iñaki Urdangarin) are not infantes, but they receive the style of The Most Excellent ; furthermore, the former can use the title of Duke consort of Soria as long as he remains her consort or remains a widower.

The Spanish law allows the monarch to grant the title of infante by royal decree in exceptional circumstances outside of the above mentioned cases to people that prove to be worthy (they are then called infantes by grace). This title was for example granted to Carlos de Borbón, Duke of Calabria, pretender to the throne of the Two-Sicilies and cousin of King Juan Carlos I.

History 

In the medieval Spanish monarchies, be it the Castilian and Leonese, the Navarran or the Aragonese, all sons and daughters of the kings, including the first borns, were infantes. However, at the end of the 14th century, King John I of Castile, son and successor of Henry II of Castile, when marrying his first born son, the Infante Enrique -future Henry III- with Catherine of Lancaster, granddaughter of the dethroned and executed Peter of Castile, created the title of Prince of Asturias for the couple. This title was then passed to the successive heirs, no matter if they were males or females. By birth, the first borns of the kings had the title of infantes like their brothers and sisters, but when they were proclaimed as heirs before the Cortes, they then became Princes of Asturias.

The same happened in Navarre, when Charles III created for his grandson, the Infante Carlos, son of his daughter Blanca and the future John II of Aragon, the title of Prince of Viana, with the idea that this title should be passed to the heirs of the Crown of Navarre. But when Navarre was conquered by Ferdinand II of Aragon in 1512, the title of the heir of Navarre was assumed by the heir of Castile and Aragon, even thought the exiled Albret family continued using the title for their heirs.

Regulation 
The title of infante is legally regulated by the royal decree 1368/1987, of the 6th of November, on the regime of titles, styles and honours of the Royal Family and the Regents.

Current infantes of Spain 

There are currently only female infantas. The last male infante was Infante Carlos, Duke of Calabria. According to the Spanish laws, the current infantes of Spain are:

 Sofía de Borbón y Ortiz, younger daughter of King Felipe VI.
 Elena de Borbón y de Grecia, Duchess of Lugo, first daughter of King Juan Carlos I and sister of King Felipe VI.
 Cristina de Borbón y de Grecia, younger daughter of King Juan Carlos I and sister of King Felipe VI.
 Margarita de Borbón y Borbón, Duchess of Soria and Hernani, younger daughter of the Count of Barcelona and aunt of King Felipe VI.

References

Spanish royal families
Family law